The women's javelin throw event at the 1999 All-Africa Games was held at the Johannesburg Stadium.

Results

References

Athletics at the 1999 All-Africa Games